Archibald Alexander Malloy (October 31, 1886 – March 1, 1961) was a Major League Baseball pitcher who played with the St. Louis Browns in .

External links

1886 births
1961 deaths
Major League Baseball pitchers
Baseball players from North Carolina
St. Louis Browns players
Houston Buffaloes players
Nashville Vols players
Galveston Sand Crabs players
San Antonio Bronchos players
People from Laurinburg, North Carolina
People from Ferris, Texas